Stojačić is a Serbian surname. It may refer to:

Stefan Stojačić (born 1989), Serbian professional basketball player
Strahinja Stojačić (born 1992), Serbian professional basketball player

See also
Stojanović, a surname
Stojković, a surname
Stojmenović, a surname

Serbian surnames